The 1984 Camus Hong Kong Masters was a professional non-ranking snooker tournament held in Hong Kong in September 1984.

Steve Davis won the tournament, defeating Doug Mountjoy 4–2 in the final.

Main draw

References

Hong Kong Masters
Hong Kong Masters
Hong Kong Masters
Hong Kong Masters